Haefliger may refer to the following people:
André Haefliger (1929-2023), Swiss mathematician
Andreas Haefliger, Swiss pianist, son of Ernst 
Ernst Haefliger (1919–2007), Swiss tenor
Fred Haefliger, United States Marine Corps in World War I

Haefliger may also refer to:
Haefliger structure in mathematics